Scandalous may refer to:

Songs
 "Scandalous" (Mis-Teeq song), a 2003 song by Mis-Teeq
 "Scandalous!", a Prince song which was the love theme to the 1989 film Batman
"Scandalous", a song by The Click from the album Game Related

Albums
 Scandalous (album), a 1983 music album by British group Imagination 
 Scandalous: The All Star Compilation, a 2002 compilation album

Others
 Scandalous (film), a 1984 comedy film starring Robert Hays
 Scandalous: The Life and Trials of Aimee Semple McPherson, a 2012 Broadway musical about Aimee Semple McPherson
 Scandalous (novel), 2010 novel by Martel Maxwell

See also
Scandal (disambiguation)
Ms Scandalous (born 1985), British female rap/pop musician